The 2012–13 Rain or Shine Elasto Painters season was the seventh season of the franchise in the Philippine Basketball Association (PBA).

Key dates
August 19: The 2012 PBA Draft took place in Robinson's Midtown Mall, Manila.

Draft picks

Roster

Philippine Cup

Eliminations

Standings

Game log

|- bgcolor="#bbffbb" 
| 1
|  October 3
|  Petron Blaze
|  102–86
|  Chan (20)
|  Cruz, Araña (8)
|  Norwood (6)
|  Smart Araneta Coliseum
|  1–0
|  Boxscore
|- bgcolor="#edbebf" 
| 2
|  October 7
|  Barangay Ginebra
|  94–98
|  Chan (25)
|  Quiñahan (10)
|  Tang, Quiñahan (4)
|  Smart Araneta Coliseum
|  1–1
|  Boxscore
|- bgcolor="#bbffbb" 
| 3
|  October 12
|  Air21
|  99–98*
|  Chan (35)
|  Cruz (8)
|  Chan (4)
|  Smart Araneta Coliseum
|  2–1
|  Boxscore
|- bgcolor="#bbffbb" 
| 4
|  October 20
|  GlobalPort
|  94–83
|  Cruz (22)
|  Cruz (16)
|  Norwood (8)
|  Ynares Center
|  3–1
|  Boxscore
|- bgcolor="#bbffbb" 
| 5
|  October 24
|  San Mig Coffee
|  80–79
|  Chan (22)
|  Norwood, Quiñahan (10)
|  Belga (4)
|  Smart Araneta Coliseum
|  4–1
|  Boxscore
|- bgcolor="#edbebf" 
| 6
|  October 27
|  Talk 'N Text
|  77–80
|  Cruz (14)
|  Cruz (12)
|  Norwood (5)
|  Victorias City
|  4–2
|  Boxscore

|- bgcolor="#bbffbb" 
| 7
|  November 4
|  Meralco
|  106–81
|  Ibañes (23)
|  Cruz (10)
|  Rodriguez, Cruz (5)
|  Smart Araneta Coliseum
|  5–2
|  Boxscore
|- bgcolor="#bbffbb" 
| 8
|  November 7
|  Alaska
|  101–93
|  Chan (22)
|  Rodriguez (8)
|  Norwood (5)
|  Smart Araneta Coliseum
|  6–2
|  Boxscore
|- bgcolor="#edbebf" 
| 9
|  November 14
|  Petron Blaze
|  86–96
|  Chan (20)
|  Cruz (7)
|  Norwood (4)
|  Smart Araneta Coliseum
|  6–3
|  Boxscore
|- bgcolor="#bbffbb" 
| 10
|  November 17
|  Air21
|  71–62
|  Chan (15)
|  Rodriguez, Quiñahan (8)
|  Norwood (4)
|  Tubod, Lanao del Norte
|  7–3
|  Boxscore
|- bgcolor="#bbffbb" 
| 11
|  November 21
|  Meralco
|  102–98*
|  Chan (25)
|  Cruz, Norwood (11)
|  Belga (5)
|  Smart Araneta Coliseum
|  8–3
|  Boxscore
|- bgcolor="#edbebf" 
| 12
|  November 25
|  Barangay Ginebra
|  90–97
|  Cruz (17)
|  Cruz (12)
|  Chan, Norwood, Quiñahan (4)
|  Smart Araneta Coliseum
|  8–4
|  Boxscore

|- bgcolor="#edbebf" 
| 13
|  December 2
|  San Mig Coffee
|  92–93
|  Chan (21)
|  Belga (6)
|  Norwood, Belga, Rodriguez, Araña (4)
|  Smart Araneta Coliseum
|  8–5
|  Boxscore
|- bgcolor="#bbffbb" 
| 14
|  December 7
|  Barako Bull
|  116–101
|  Cruz (23)
|  Belga (7)
|  Lee (6)
|  Mall of Asia Arena
|  9–5
|  Boxscore

Playoffs

Bracket

Game log

|- bgcolor="#bbffbb" 
| 1
|  December 12
|  Barangay Ginebra
|  82–65
|  Cruz (14)
|  Belga (11)
|  Chan (5)
|  Smart Araneta Coliseum
|  1–0
|  Boxscores
|- bgcolor="#edbebf" 
| 2
|  December 14
|  Barangay Ginebra
|  77–79
|  Lee (19)
|  Cruz (8)
|  Chan (5)
|  Smart Araneta Coliseum
|  1–1
|  Boxscore
|- bgcolor="#bbffbb" 
| 3
|  December 16
|  Barangay Ginebra
|  102–89
|  Lee (25)
|  Cruz, Rodriguez (8)
|  Norwood (6)
|  Smart Araneta Coliseum
|  2–1
|  Boxscore

|- bgcolor="#bbffbb"
| 1
|  December 19
|  San Mig Coffee
|  91–83
|  Chan (18)
|  Cruz (15)
|  Belga (5)
|  Smart Araneta Coliseum
|  1–0
|  Boxscore
|- bgcolor="#edbebf" 
| 2
|  December 21
|  San Mig Coffee
|  82–106
|  Rodriguez, Quiñahan (12)
|  Cruz, Belga (9)
|  Lee (5)
|  Mall of Asia Arena
|  1–1
|  Boxscore
|- bgcolor="#bbffbb"
| 3
|  December 25
|  San Mig Coffee
|  98–72
|  Lee (15)
|  Chan (8)
|  Norwood (7)
|  Mall of Asia Arena
|  2–1
|  Boxscore
|- bgcolor="#bbffbb" 
| 4
|  December 28
|  San Mig Coffee
|  83–74
|  Norwood (14)
|  Quiñahan (7)
|  Norwood, 2 others (3)
|  Mall of Asia Arena
|  3–1
|  Boxscore
|- bgcolor="#edbebf" 
| 5
|  December 30
|  San Mig Coffee
|  67–79
|  Rodriguez (14)
|  Rodriguez, Cruz (7)
|  Cruz, Tiu (4)
|  Mall of Asia Arena
|  3–2
|  Boxscore
|- bgcolor="#bbffbb" 
| 6
|  January 3
|  San Mig Coffee
|  90–83
|  Chan (27)
|  Norwood, Belga (12)
|  Lee (4)
|  Mall of Asia Arena
|  4–2
|  Boxscore

|- bgcolor="#edbebf" 
| 1
|  January 9
|  Talk 'N Text
|  81–87
|  Cruz (13)
|  Cruz (9)
|  Rodriguez, Ibañes (3)
|  Smart Araneta Coliseum
|  0–1
|  Boxscore
|- bgcolor="#edbebf" 
| 2
|  January 11
|  Talk 'N Text
|  81–89
|  Quiñahan (16)
|  Lee (9)
|  Lee (4)
|  Mall of Asia Arena
|  0–2
|  Boxscore
|- bgcolor="#edbebf" 
| 3
|  January 13
|  Talk 'N Text
|  80–89
|  Tiu (14)
|  Belga (9)
|  Norwood (4)
|  Smart Araneta Coliseum
|  0–3
|  Boxscore
|- bgcolor="#edbebf" 
| 4
|  January 16
|  Talk 'N Text
|  82–105
|  Rodriguez (16)
|  Norwood (10)
|  Chan (4)
|  Smart Araneta Coliseum
|  0–4
|  Boxscore

Commissioner's Cup

Eliminations

Standings

Game log

|- bgcolor="#edbebf" 
| 1
|  February 9
|  Alaska
|  81–83
|  Šundov (30)
|  Šundov (15)
|  Norwood, Chan (3)
|  Smart Araneta Coliseum
|  0–1
|  boxscore
|- bgcolor="#bbffbb" 
| 2
|  February 16
|  Meralco
|  91–82
|  Šundov, Araña (20)
|  Šundov (19)
|  Lee (6)
|  Puerto Princesa, Palawan
|  1–1
|  boxscore
|- bgcolor="#bbffbb" 
| 3
|  February 22
|  San Mig Coffee
|  93–65
|  Cruz (16)
|  Šundov (11)
|  Tiu (8)
|  Mall of Asia Arena
|  2–1
|  boxscore
|- bgcolor="#bbffbb" 
| 4
|  February 27
|  Air21
|  99–97
|  Šundov (17)
|  Belga (10)
|  Lee (7)
|  Smart Araneta Coliseum
|  3–1
|  boxscore

|- bgcolor="#bbffbb" 
| 5
|  March 3
|  Barangay Ginebra
|  96–93
|  Belga (18)
|  Belga (9)
|  Šundov (4)
|  Smart Araneta Coliseum
|  4–1
|  boxscore
|- bgcolor="#bbffbb" 
| 6
|  March 8
|  GlobalPort
|  103–95
|  Šundov (17)
|  Šundov (15)
|  Šundov, Tiu (4)
|  Smart Araneta Coliseum
|  5–1
|  boxscore
|- 
| 7
|  March 13
|  Talk 'N Text
|  
|  
|  
|  
|  Smart Araneta Coliseum
|  
|  
|- 
| 8
|  March 16
|  Petron Blaze
|  
|  
|  
|  
|  Panabo, Davao del Norte
|  
|  
|- 
| 9
|  March 20
|  Barako Bull
|  
|  
|  
|  
|  Smart Araneta Coliseum
|  
|

Governors' Cup

Eliminations

Standings

Game log

Transactions

Trades

Pre-season

Recruited imports

References

Rain or Shine Elasto Painters seasons
Rain or Shine